Egyptian script may mean:
 Egyptian hieroglyphs
 Egyptian hieratic
 Egyptian demotic